"Golden Age" is a 2008 song by the band TV on the Radio, the first single from their album Dear Science. It was number 12 on Rolling Stone's list of the 100 Best Songs of 2008. Spin magazine chose the song as the 8th best song of the year. MTV ranked it as the 20th best song of the year, and Pitchfork chose it as the 51st best song of the year.

The rock band Phish began covering "Golden Age" at their concerts in 2009.

References

2008 singles
TV on the Radio songs
4AD singles
2008 songs
Songs written by Dave Sitek